James Joseph Ryan (29 August 1918 – 4 June 2006) was an Australian rules footballer who played with Melbourne in the Victorian Football League (VFL).

References

External links 

1918 births
Australian rules footballers from Victoria (Australia)
Melbourne Football Club players
Old Xaverians Football Club players
2006 deaths